The Ministry of Youth & Sports  is a Somaliland government ministry that is in charge of regulating activities related to sports and youth development in Somaliland. The current minister is Yusuf Mire Mohamed.

Overview
In 2011, the ministry held its first major tournament, a Multi-sport event between the regions of the country called Somaliland Regional Games at Alamzey Stadium in Burao.

Ministers of Youth and Sports

See also

Somaliland national football team
Hargeisa Stadium
Alamzey Stadium

References

External links

Politics of Somaliland
Government ministries of Somaliland